The 254 mm 45 caliber Pattern 1891 was a Russian naval gun developed in the years before the Russo-Japanese War that armed coastal defense ships and pre-dreadnought battleships during the Russo-Japanese War and World War I.  Guns salvaged from scrapped ships found a second life as coastal artillery.  It is believed none were in service during World War II.

History
The 254 mm 45 caliber Pattern 1891 was the product of an agreement between the Imperial Russian Army and Navy to standardize calibers and ammunition during 1892. The weights and dimensions of the new gun were expected to be as close to the original specifications as possible to remain compatible with the ships they were intended to arm. This compromise in design objectives was to have negative effects on the finished product.

Testing in 1895 found that the guns were too lightly built to be able to achieve the specified muzzle velocity even with lower power brown powder. Barrel life was estimated to be 250 rounds.

The elevation range for the gun turrets of the Ushakov, Seniavin, Rostislav was -5° to +15°.  The elevation range for gun turrets of the Apraksin, Pobeda, Peresvet and Oslyabya was -5° to +30°.  The rate of fire was 120 seconds for Admiral Seniavin, 107 seconds for Ushakov, 93 seconds for Apraksin, but only 80 seconds for Peresvet, Oslyabya and Pobeda.

Construction 
The 254 mm 45 caliber Pattern 1891 is believed to be constructed in the same manner as the larger 305mm 40 caliber Pattern 1895 guns of the same period.  They were constructed of an A tube and three layers of reinforcing hoops and a jacket.  By 1901 the Obukhov State Plant had delivered 30 guns of which 27 were installed on ships. In addition to the guns installed on ships some were employed as coastal artillery, including one battery of five guns at Port Arthur in 1904 and another in the Moon sound area in 1917.

Naval use

Coastal defense ships
 Admiral Ushakov-class - This class of three ships primary armament consisted of four, 254 mm 45 caliber guns, in twin gun turrets, fore and aft of the ships superstructure.   Except for General Admiral Graf Apraksin, whose rear turret only had one gun.

Pre-dreadnought battleships
 Peresvet-class - This class of three ships primary armament consisted of four, 254 mm 45 caliber guns, in twin gun turrets, fore and aft of the ships superstructure.
 Rostislav - This ships primary armament consisted of four, 254 mm 45 caliber guns, in twin gun turrets, fore and aft of the ships superstructure.

Ammunition

Ammunition was of loading bagged charge and projectile type.

The gun was able to fire:
 Armor Piercing
 High Explosive

Photo gallery

References

Notes

External links
 http://www.navweaps.com/Weapons/WNRussian_10-45_m1891.php
 http://navalhistory.flixco.info/H/208155x54503/8330/a0.htm

Artillery of the Russian Empire
Russo-Japanese war weapons of Russia
Artillery of the Soviet Union
Coastal artillery
254 mm artillery
Obukhov State Plant products